Alexander Nicolás Machado Aycaguer (born 28 May 2002) is a Uruguayan professional footballer who plays as a winger for Uruguayan Primera División club Boston River.

Club career
A youth academy graduate of Cerro, Machado made his professional debut for the club on 5 May 2019 in a 2–0 league defeat against Defensor Sporting. Prior to 2021 season, he joined Boston River.

International career
Machado is a former Uruguay youth international. He was part of under-17 team at 2019 South American U-17 Championship. He played four matches in the tournament and scored a goal.

References

External links
 

2002 births
Living people
Footballers from Montevideo
Association football forwards
Uruguayan footballers
Uruguay youth international footballers
Uruguayan Primera División players
C.A. Cerro players
Boston River players